Droogmansia montana is a plant in the legume family Fabaceae, native to Guinea.

Description
Inflorescences have flowers with bright yellow and purple petals. The fruits are pod-shaped.

Distribution and habitat
Droogmansia montana is endemic to Guinea.

Conservation
Droogmansia montana occurs on the Kounounkan Plateau in Guinea. Only four plants were observed in 2017 field work. The main threats are from bush fire, urban expansion and livestock farming. With these threats and the very low species population, Droogmansia montana is assessed as Endangered.

References

Desmodieae
Endemic flora of Guinea
Plants described in 1946